Červený Újezd is a municipality and village in Prague-West District in the Central Bohemian Region of the Czech Republic. It has about 1,500 inhabitants.

Geography
It lies in an agricultural landscape on the border between the Prague Plateau and Křivoklát Highlands.

History
The first written mention of Červený Újezd is from 1318.

Sights
In the local part named Hájek is located a pilgrimage site with a Franciscan monastery. The oldest part of the early Baroque complex is a Loretan chapel, built in 1623–1625. The monastery was then added to the chapel in 1663–1681. Hájek is the destination of the pilgrimage starting in Prague-Břevnov.

In 2001, an artificial castle was built in Červený Újezd. It houses a museum, but it also serves cultural and social purposes. There is a small open-air museum in the castle's gardens.

References

External links

Villages in Prague-West District